Paul Maher is a tipperary hurler and footballer from Kilsheelan.

Career
Maher made his senior debut for Tipperary on 8 March 2020, starting at right corner back in the fifth round of the 2020 National Hurling League against Galway in a 3-13 to 3-21 defeat.

References

Living people
Kilsheelan-Kilcash hurlers
Tipperary inter-county hurlers
Year of birth missing (living people)